The 2022–23 Serie A de México season is part of the third-tier football league of Mexico. The tournament began on 26 August 2022 and will finish in May 2023.

Offseason Changes
On May 21, 2022 Aguacateros CDU was promoted from Serie B de México.
On May 25, 2022 UACH F.C. franchise on hiatus was reactivated and renamed Chihuahua F.C.
On May 28, 2022 Deportiva Venados was promoted from Liga TDP.
On June 14, 2022 Durango was accepted as a new member of the Liga de Expansión MX after passing the certification process to join the competition, Durango was the champion of the 2021–22 Serie A de México season.
 On June 22, 2022, the Atlético Reynosa franchise was reactivated, the team was relocated to Tampico  and Ciudad Madero and renamed Tampico Madero.
 On July 1, 2022 Los Cabos United, Mexicali, Real de Arteaga and Tulancingo joined the league as expansion teams.
 On July 1, 2022 Pachuca Reserve Team was reactivated after a 4–years hiatus.
 On July 1, 2022 Cañoneros and Mazorqueros were relocated at Serie B de México.
 On July 14, 2022, Liguilla de Filiales (reserve teams play-off) it was recovered after three years without playing. Six teams have this condition and are not eligible for promotion to Liga de Expansión MX: Cimarrones de Sonora, Leones Negros UdeG, Lobos ULMX, Mineros de Fresnillo, Pachuca and UAT. The best four teams with this condition will play the play-offs.

Clausura Tournament changes
 On January 27, 2023 Catedráticos Elite F.C. was relocated from Ameca, Jalisco to Salamanca, Guanajuato.

Teams information

Group 1

Group 2

Group 3
{{Location map+ |Mexico |width=650|float=right |caption=Location of teams in the 2022–23 Serie A Group 3 |places=

Torneo Apertura

Group 1

Standings

Positions by Round

Results

Group 2

Standings

Positions by Round

Results

Group 3

Standings

Positions by Round

Results

Regular Season statistics

Top goalscorers
Players sorted first by goals scored, then by last name.

Source:Liga Premier FMF

Hat-tricks

(H) – Home ; (A) – Away

Attendance

Per team

Highest and lowest

Source: Liga Premier FMF

Liguilla

Liguilla de Ascenso
The two best teams and the two best third places of each group play two games against each other on a home-and-away basis. The higher seeded teams play on their home field during the second leg. The winner of each match up is determined by aggregate score. In the quarterfinals and semifinals, if the two teams are tied on aggregate the higher seeded team advances. In the final, if the two teams are tied after both legs, the match goes to extra time and, if necessary, a penalty shoot-out.

Quarter-finals
The first legs will be played on 26 October, and the second legs will be played on 29 October 2022.

First leg

Second leg

Semi-finals
The first legs were played on 2 November, and the second legs were played on 5 November 2022.

First leg

Second leg

Final
The first leg was played on 10 November, and the second leg will be played on 13 November 2022.

First leg

Second leg

Liguilla de Filiales
The four best reserve teams of the season play two games against each other on a home-and-away basis. The higher seeded teams play on their home field during the second leg. The winner of each match up is determined by aggregate score. In the semifinals, if the two teams are tied on aggregate the higher seeded team advances. In the final, if the two teams are tied after both legs, the match goes to extra time and, if necessary, a penalty shoot-out.

 Liguilla de Filiales Champion qualifies for Copa Conecta.

Semi-finals
The first legs were played on 27 October, and the second legs were played on 30 and 31 October 2022.

First leg

Second leg

Final

First leg

Second leg

Torneo Clausura
The Torneo Clausura began on 6 January 2023.

Group 1

Standings

Positions by Round

Results

Group 2

Standings

Positions by Round

Results

Group 3

Standings

Positions by Round

Results

Regular Season statistics

Top goalscorers
Players sorted first by goals scored, then by last name.

Source:Liga Premier FMF

Hat-tricks

(H) – Home ; (A) – Away

Attendance

Per team

Highest and lowest

Source: Liga Premier FMF

Liguilla

Liguilla de Ascenso
The two best teams and the two best third places of each group play two games against each other on a home-and-away basis. The higher seeded teams play on their home field during the second leg. The winner of each match up is determined by aggregate score. In the quarterfinals and semifinals, if the two teams are tied on aggregate the higher seeded team advances. In the final, if the two teams are tied after both legs, the match goes to extra time and, if necessary, a penalty shoot-out.

Quarter-finals
The first legs will be played on 24, 25 or 26 March, and the second legs will be played on 31 March, 1 or 2 April 2023.

First leg

Second leg

Liguilla de Filiales
The four best reserve teams of the season play two games against each other on a home-and-away basis. The higher seeded teams play on their home field during the second leg. The winner of each match up is determined by aggregate score. In the semifinals, if the two teams are tied on aggregate the higher seeded team advances. In the final, if the two teams are tied after both legs, the match goes to extra time and, if necessary, a penalty shoot-out.

Semi-finals
The first legs will be played on 24, 25 or 26 March, and the second legs will be played on 31 March, 1 or 2 April 2023.

First leg

Second leg

Coefficient table 

Last updated: March 18, 2023 Source: Liga Premier FMFP = Position; G = Games played; Pts = Points; Pts/G = Ratio of points to games played; GD = Goal difference

Promotion Final
The Promotion Final is a series of matches played by the champions of the tournaments Apertura and Clausura, the game is played to determine the winning team of the promotion to Liga de Expansión MX, as long as the winning team meets the league requirements. 

The first leg will be played on 6 May 2023, and the second leg will be played on 13 May 2023.

See also 
2022–23 Liga MX season
2022–23 Liga de Expansión MX season
2022–23 Serie B de México season
2022–23 Liga TDP season
2023 Copa Conecta

References

External links
 Official website of Liga Premier FMF

1